Aristide Guerriero is an Italian former shot putter and throwing specialist. He is the strength and conditioning coach for the Nagato Blue Angels Rugby Football Club.

Early life 
Aristide Guerriero was born in Gaeta, Italy.

Athlete career 
He began his career as thrower at the Olympic Training Centre in Formia, where he began competing and quickly earned a reputation for his throwing ability.

Personal life 
Guerriero earned his master's degree in Sport Science at Foro Italico University of Rome. He is strength and conditioning specialist (CSCS), tactical facilitator (TSAC-F) through the National Strength & Conditioning Association. He is also certified as track and field coach.

Coaching career

2006 - 2013 
Guerriero began his coaching career at the Olympic Training Centre in Formia as throws specialist and strength coach. As strength coach he worked with: american football, track and field, rugby union, rugby league and military.

2013 - 2015 
Guerriero served two years as the head strength and conditioning coach for the New Zealand Sports Academy in Wellington, Rotorua and Auckland. He worked with former Maori All Blacks Jim Love and Darrall Shelford. He also supervised the netball strength and conditioning program under the head coach Noeline Taurua. During this period he worked closely with Maori and Pacific Islands rugby union and rugby league athletes.

In Wellington he collaborated with former Samoan thrower Shaka Sola, supervising the training of young New Zealand throwers.
He was the strength and conditioning coach for Te Wananga o Aotearoa.

2015 - 2021
From 2015 he is the strength and conditioning coach for the Brazil women's national rugby union team (sevens). In July 2015 the team won the Bronze medal at the XVII Pan American Games in Toronto.

The team finished in 9th position at the 2016 Summer Olympics.

In 2018 Guerriero became the head of athletic performance of Brazil national rugby union team. He has been one of the strength and conditioning coaches for the first World Rugby Americas Combine in Glendale with some of the best athletes from Brazil, Uruguay, Canada, the USA, Chile, and Venezuela. The Americas Combine XV Team won the final match versus the Colorado Raptors 59-31.

In 2019 Brazil Women Rugby 7s Team won the Hong Kong World Rugby Sevens Series Qualifier beating Scotland in the final 28-19. Since then Brazil has been a core team on the HSBC World Rugby Sevens Series.

Guerriero prepared the Brazil women's national rugby sevens team for the second 2020 Summer Olympics. The team won the Gold Medal in the 2019 Sudamérica Rugby Women's Sevens Olympic Qualifying Tournament and then finished 11th in Tokyo.

2021 - current
In January 2022, Guerriero was signed as strength and conditioning coach for the Japanese team Nagato Blue Angels Rugby Football Club.

Academic Work
Since 2016, he has co-authored various papers on the impact of sled loads and velocity-based training on rugby performance.

References

1986 births
Living people
Italian male shot putters
Strength and conditioning coaches
Coaches of international rugby sevens teams
Rugby union strength and conditioning coaches